A domestic market, also referred to as an internal market or domestic trading, is the supply and demand of goods, services, and securities within a single country. In domestic trading, a firm faces only one set of competitive, economic, and market issues and essentially must deal with only one set of customers, although the company may have several segments in a market.

The term is also used to refer to the customers of a single business who live in the country where the business operates.  

There are certain limitations when competing in a domestic market, many of which encourage firms to expand abroad. The main reasons why a business would decide to expand abroad are limited market size and limited growth within the domestic market.

South Korea 
The Korean domestic market or Korean domestic motors (KDM) is the name for South Korea's economic market for domestic-brand goods, chiefly automobiles and parts. South Korea's main export markets are the United States and Canada. While the United States often uses an original equipment manufacturer (OEM) for assembly, the KDM makes all its products under their own brand.

References

Financial markets